Katy Hayward is a Northern Irish academic and writer based at Queens University, Belfast.

Academic career 
Hayward is a Reader in Sociology at Queens in Belfast, with a specialism in conflict resolution. She completed her undergraduate degree in Peace and Conflict Studies at Magee College in 1999. She was awarded a PhD in 2002 by University College, Dublin on the impact of European integration on cross-border relations in Ireland.

She has fellowships including at ‘’UK in a Changing Europe’’, an ESRC-funded initiative, as well as at the Senator George J. Mitchell Institute for Global Peace, Security and Justice at Queens. In 2019, she became an Eisenhower Fellow.

Writing 
In addition to her academic writing, Hayward writes regularly for The Guardian, Belfast Telegraph, and the Irish Times.

Other work 
Hayward is a trustee of Conciliation Resources, an independent organisation working with people in conflict to prevent violence and build peace.

References

External links

Living people
Year of birth missing (living people)
Academics of Queen's University Belfast